The 2014 British Grand Prix (formally the 2014 Formula 1 Santander British Grand Prix) was a Formula One motor race held on 6 July 2014 at the Silverstone Circuit in Silverstone, United Kingdom before a crowd of 122,000 people. It was the ninth round of the 2014 Formula One World Championship, and the 65th British Grand Prix to be held as part of the series. Lewis Hamilton of the Mercedes team won the 52-lap race, from a sixth position start. Williams driver Valtteri Bottas finished second, with Daniel Ricciardo third for the Red Bull squad. It was Hamilton's fifth victory of 2014 and the 27th of his career.

Hamilton's teammate Nico Rosberg recorded the fastest lap in qualifying to start from pole position. The race was suspended for one hour, five minutes after a first-lap accident involving Kimi Räikkönen left a section of guardrail barrier needing repair. Rosberg led for 18 laps after the restart as Hamilton moved to second, then made a pit stop for tyres, giving the lead to Hamilton for six laps. Hamilton took the lead for good when Rosberg retired from a gearbox fault on the 29th lap; he won by more than  a minute over Bottas. Ricciardo held off McLaren's Jenson Button in the final laps to take third.

Rosberg's non-finish left him with a reduced lead of four points over Hamilton in the Drivers' Championship. Ricciardo and Fernando Alonso of Ferrari maintained third and fourth respectively, and Bottas passed Red Bull driver Sebastian Vettel for fifth. In the Constructors' Championship, Mercedes held a 158-point lead over Red Bull and Ferrari was third. Williams overtook Force India for fourth with ten races left in the season.

Background
The 2014 British Grand Prix was the 9th of the 19 races in the 2014 FIA Formula One World Championship and the 65th edition of the event as a round of the World Championship. It was held at the 18-turn  Silverstone Circuit in Silverstone, Northamptonshire, England on 6 July. Tyre supplier Pirelli brought a white-banded Medium and orange-banded Hard dry-compounds to the race as well as two wet-weather compounds, the intermediate and full wet tyres. The drag reduction system (DRS), an adjustable flap at the back of each car that helps with overtaking when activated, had two activation zones for the race: one on the Wellington Straight linking the Arena and Brookands turns, and one on the Hangar Straight between Chapel and Stowe corners. After the 2013 race, artificial grass was removed at the exits at three corner, the inside side barrier at the entrance to Brooklands corner was enlargened, and circuit drainage was improved.

After the  two weeks earlier, Mercedes driver Nico Rosberg led the Drivers' Championship with 165 points, ahead of his second-placed teammate Lewis Hamilton with 136 points. Daniel Ricciardo of the Red Bull team was third with 83 points, and Ferrari's Fernando Alonso followed close behind in fourth with 79 points. Sebastian Vettel, in the second Red Bull car, was fifth with 60 points. Mercedes led the Constructors' Championship with 301 points with Red Bull second with 143 points, Ferrari with 98 points, and Force India with 87 points battling Williams with 85 points for fourth position.

After a series of errors in the previous four rounds left Hamilton 29 points behind Rosberg, the Mercedes non-executive chairman Niki Lauda suggested this would motivate Hamilton to perform better at the British Grand Prix and saw no reason to guide him in his driving, "Lewis will fight back, there is no worry on my case about this at all. He is not in any way disturbed. He will keep fighting. Don't worry." Valtteri Bottas said Williams intended to run well at Silverstone and sought to build on the momentum from Austria, "I am really looking forward to Silverstone. It's always a great event and means a lot to us as it's the team's home Grand Prix, so hopefully some of the guys from the factory can come up and support us as well." Ricciardo said he was looking forward to the race as he liked the Silverstone track.

There were a total of 11 teams (each representing a different constructor) each fielded two race drivers for the Grand Prix with four driver changes for the first practice session. Williams development driver Susie Wolff drove for the team in lieu of Bottas, becoming the first woman to take part in a Formula One Grand Prix weekend since Giovanna Amati's attempted to qualify for the 1992 Brazilian Grand Prix. Force India gave Daniel Juncadella, the team's reserve and simulator driver and Mercedes-Benz Deutsche Tourenwagen Masters racer, his first Formula One race appearance in Nico Hülkenberg's car at Silverstone. Finally, and for the fourth time in 2014, Giedo van der Garde took Adrian Sutil's Sauber seat.

Practice

Per the regulations for the 2014 season, three practice sessions were held: two 90-minute sessions on Friday and another 60-minute session on Saturday. In the first session, Rosberg set the fastest lap at 1 minute, 35.424 seconds. Hamilton, Alonso, Ricciardo, Kimi Räikkönen, Vettel, Jenson Button, Daniil Kvyat, Jean-Éric Vergne and Kevin Magnussen were in positions two to ten. His damaged Williams FW36 car stopped near the entry to the pit lane and the session was halted for 17 minutes as track marshals removed it. Later, an oil pressure problem caused Wolff's engine to shut down after four laps, and Marcus Ericsson spun at Becketts turn. After the session, Ricciardo and Rosberg were summoned to the stewards for overtaking Alonso and Kvyat under red flag conditions. Both drivers were deemed to have driven safely under series regulations after data examination and their explanations convinced the stewards not to penalise them.

Hamilton used soft compound tyres to record the fastest lap of the second session with an early time of 1 minute, 35.508 seconds; his running was curtailed because his engine cut out with  an hour to go. Rosberg, Alonso, the Red Bull pair of Ricciardo and Vettel, Bottas, Button, Magunssen, Räikkönen and Vergne rounded out the top ten. A localised explosion tore through the left-hand side of Bottas' engine cover and loosened it with five minutes to go. Vergne's left-front wheel detached at Abbey corner and he had to stop at the side of the track. On Saturday morning, FIA race director Charlie Whiting adopted a "zero tolerance policy" and cautioned drivers not to run wide leaving Copse and Club without being forced or their lap times would be deleted in a bid to enforce stricter regulations on driving off the track. Overnight rain made the track wet and a north-westerly wind was a factor in the final session; four drivers chose not to set a timed lap and some went off the slippery track. Vettel set the fastest lap of 1 minute, 52.522 seconds, with his teammate Ricciardo second. Pastor Maldonado, Romain Grosjean, Sutil, Kvyat, Magnussen, Button, Bottas and Räikkönen completed the top ten. Jules Bianchi broke his front wing in an impact with the barrier at Stowe corner. Sutil also avoided hitting the wall at Stowe turn and exited the corner's gravel trap.

Qualifying

Saturday afternoon's qualifying session was divided into three parts. The first part ran for 18 minutes, eliminating cars that finished qualifying 17th or below. The 107% rule was in effect, requiring drivers to reach a time within 107 per cent of the fastest lap to qualify. The second part lasted 15 minutes, eliminating cars that finished 11th to 16th. The final session lasted 12 minutes and determined pole position to tenth. Cars who progressed to the final session were not allowed to change tyres for the race's start, using the tyres with which they set their best lap times in the second session. A damp track worsened as rain began to fall with increasing, if intermittent, severity; all drivers used intermediate compound tyres for the first two sessions. The rain stopped at the start of the third session and drivers used dry tyres in its first minutes. Rain soon returned and they drove to the pit lane. Several drivers returned to the circuit with three minutes left for one last try at improving their laps. Rosberg took his fourth pole position of the season and the eighth of his career with a 1-minute, 35.766 seconds lap. He was joined on the grid's front row by Vettel who bowed out of his first try due to the rain. Third-place Button went wide at Aintree corner and oversteered on the run to the Hangar Straight and began from the top three at Silverstone for the first time since the 2005 British Grand Prix. Hülkenberg in fourth briefly held pole position as he was the first driver to improve his lap on the drying track. Magnussen was fifth. Hamilton provisionally held the pole position after all first timed laps; he fell to sixth after he abandoned his final attempt because it was slower and he felt the track was not dry enough to improve his lap times.

Sergio Pérez in seventh ran wide at Chapel turn and lost heat in his tyres. Eighth-placed Ricciardo did not anticipate the improvement in track conditions and he remained in the pit lane. The Toro Rosso duo of Kvyat and Vergne were ninth and tenth. Grosjean was the fastest driver not to advance to the final session, because a yellow flag at Brooklands corner required him to slow. Marussia fuelled their cars for the second session and its reaction to the changing weather saw Bianchi qualify 12th and Max Chilton 13th. However, Chilton incurred a five-place grid penalty for changing his gearbox after the third practice session. Esteban Gutiérrez lost traction in his vehicle on a kerb leaving Brooklands corner and was sent backwards into a guardrail barrier at Luffield turn. He was 14th and also incurred a ten-place grid penalty for an unsafe release at the preceding round in Austria. Maldonado in 15th had a fuel pressure problem in the second session requiring him to stop his car. He was demoted five places for not providing the FIA with at least  of fuel for analysis. Hence, Sutil started 13th after he lost control of his car's rear and got beached in a gravel trap. A strategy error left the Williams pair of Bottas and Massa to drive on a wet track on dry compound tyres and took 14th and 15th. Alonso in 16th (who spun at Brooklands turn) and his teammate Räikkönen in 17th were also caught out by the weather and used the incorrect tyre compound, after Ferrari spent longer than most teams deciding their strategy. The Caterham cars of Ericsson and Kamui Kobayashi were slow enough to transgress the 107 per cent rule. The stewards granted them dispensation to start the race.

Qualifying classification
The fastest lap in each of the three sessions is denoted in bold.

Notes:
 – Max Chilton was given a five-place grid penalty for unscheduled gearbox change.
 – Esteban Gutiérrez was given a ten-place grid penalty for an unsafe release at the previous round in Austria.
 – Pastor Maldonado was excluded from the results for violating the rules by not having enough fuel, and he was moved to the back of the grid.
 – Marcus Ericsson and Kamui Kobayashi failed to set a lap time within 107% of the fastest lap time set by Nico Rosberg in the first session. The stewards gave them permission to start the race.

Race

The 52-lap race began before 120,000 people at 13:00 local time, with Rosberg making a brisk start to hold the lead into Abbey corner. Vettel in second had a slow start and Button and Magnussen passed him. Hamilton moved from sixth to fourth as Massa stalled from 15th. On the Wellington Straight, the rear of Räikkönen's Ferrari F14 T car got loose and he drove onto the run-off area. He was vaulted right at an angle and into the guardrail barrier close to the pillar of an overhead bridge in a  impact. The Ferrari's right-front tyre flew by Chilton, who had to duck his head to avoid being struck; his front wing and front-left brake duct were damaged.

Räikkönen ricocheted across the track and into the path of Kobayashi and Massa. Kobayashi grazed the front of the Ferrari and veered onto the grass; Massa applied the brakes upon seeing the impact, trying to spin to the right to avoid a T-bone collision. The rear of Massa's car made contact with the front of Räikkönen's. A track marshal assisted Räikkönen, who had hip and heel injuries, out of his car and into an ambulance for transport to the circuit's medical centre. The safety car was deployed for a lap until Whiting discovered the barriers were dented and needed repair, and stopped the race. Every driver was directed to stop on the grid. Damage to Massa's rear suspension necessitated his retirement. In the meantime, Chilton incurred a drive-through penalty for entering the pit lane under red flag conditions. Repairs to the barrier prevented the resumption of the race for an hour, five minutes until course workers were finished at 14:05 local time. The race was restarted behind the safety car with the drivers in the positions held before the suspension.

Both Red Bulls switched to the hard-compound tyres on the grid during the stoppage and Alonso used the softer compounds to improve the possibility of making a solitary pit stop by driving on the more durable harder tyres later on. Rosberg was first, followed by the McLarens of Button and Magnussen. Bottas overtook Kvyat at Brooklands corner to move into ninth and Hamilton began to challenge Magnussen for third. On lap three, Hamilton drew alongside Magnussen through Woodcote turn and passed him for third entering Copse corner as Magnussen ran off the track. That same lap, Bottas overtook Ricciardo on the Hangar Straight for seventh as Alonso passed Gutiérrez for twelfth. During the next lap, Hamilton drew alongside Button and overtook him on the outside at Brooklands turn for second. Alonso passed Sutil for eleventh before Brooklands corner and then Bianchi for tenth as Hülkenberg lost sixth to Bottas in Stowe turn on the fifth lap. DRS was enabled on lap six. That lap, Alonso used DRS to pass Kvyat on the outside leaving Woodcote corner and into Luffield turn for ninth. Ricciardo overtook Hülkenberg at Stowe corner and the subsequent loss of momentum allowed Alonso to get by him around the outside at Vale corner for eighth on lap seven.

On lap eight, Alonso used DRS to pass Hülkenberg on the outside at Brooklands turn after a short battle. Further back Sutil passed Bianchi for eleventh as Ricciardo battled Hülkenberg for eighth at Luffield turn on lap ten but could not pass due to the latter's higher straight-line speed. Ricciardo tried again into Stowe corner and succeeded. On the inside at Club turn on the same lap, Gutiérrez attempted to pass Maldonado, who sought to overtake Bianchi. Gutiérrez hit Maldonado's left-hand side; contact continued through the corner and Maldonado was launched airborne off Gutiérrez's right-front tyre. Gutiérrez got beached in a gravel trap and retired with rear car damage. The first pit stops for tyres occurred on lap 11 as Vettel entered the pit lane to try and pass the McLarens; the faster Bottas, behind him, was thus freed to try to catch Magnussen. On the next lap, Ericsson's suspension failed on the Brooklands corner kerb and he drove to the pit lane to retire. Alonso incurred a five-second stop-and-go penalty on the 13th lap because he was deemed to have been out of position on his grid slot for the restart.

By the 14th lap Bottas had caught Magnussen, and entering Stowe corner used his DRS and better speed to pass him on the outside for fourth. Alonso overtook Magnussen around the outside of Stowe corner for fifth as Ricciardo made a pit stop for the soft compound tyres on lap 15. Two laps later, Bottas passed Button at Stowe turn for third. On that lap, Ricciardo passed Sutil on the approach to Stowe corner for ninth. Rosberg made his first pit stop from the lead on the 18th lap. Hamilton led for six laps; the plan was for him to run the middle stint on the hard-compound tyres before his own stop at the conclusion of lap 24. In the meantime, Rosberg began developing gearbox problems on lap 20. As Alonso battled with Button, a stone lodged in his rear wing slot gap that remained there for the rest of the Grand Prix. He twice oversteered coming through Becketts corner as Ricciardo passed Hülkenberg for eighth. Rosberg had increased his advantage over Hamilton, whose pit stop lasted 1.7 seconds than expected as his hard-compound left-rear wheel was slow to install at his pit box, to six seconds.

On the 25th lap, Vettel passed Magnussen for sixth at the exit of Luffield turn. Three laps later, Alonso overtook Hülkenberg through Copse corner for eighth after the former took his five-second stop-and-go penalty. As Hamilton reduced Rosberg's lead from six to four seconds within three laps on his newer tyres, the latter had gear-selection problems. Rosberg attempted to change his gearbox's settings; this did not work as he slowed at Village corner and Hamilton took the lead on the Wellington Straight on lap 29. Rosberg steered onto the grass down the approach to Becketts corner, and retired due to his gearbox. Attention then focused on the battle for third. Ricciardo's pit stop allowed him to change his strategy into a one-stopper, as tyre degradation rates were less than during the two Friday practice sessions. Bottas made his second pit stop on lap 32 and emerged in third behind Vettel. Two laps later, Bottas glimpsed space and passed Vettel for second on the Hangar Straight.

Vettel immediately made a second pit stop at the end of the lap. He rejoined ahead of Alonso in fifth place. Alonso twice passed Vettel around the outside at Copse corner during a duel for fifth between laps 35 and 36. On lap 37, Vettel had optimum tyre temperature, and used DRS on the Wellington Straight to pass Alonso on the outside under braking. Alonso then went across the front of Vettel leaving Brooklands corner to retain fifth. Vettel saw space to pass Alonso at Brooklands corner on lap 42, but the latter blocked his pass on the racing line. Three laps later, Vettel turned to the outside of Luffield corner. Although he did not pass Alonso, Vettel entered the straight faster than the former who reacted by turning to the inside past the former Grand Prix pit lane to block him. On the 47th lap, Vettel turned to the outside at Brooklands corner to draw alongside Alonso through Woodcote turn but Alonso kept fifth by braking later than him.

Vettel was aided by the rear of Alonso's car stepping out into Copse corner and overtook him on the outside for fifth. Once past, Vettel pulled away from Alonso. In the meantime, Button drew closer to Ricciardo; he had made a pit stop earlier than the latter, and his two-stop strategy left him the faster of the two. Maldonado's exhaust failed on the 51st lap, and he retired at the side of the track at Abbey turn with smoke billowing from the rear of his car. Unchallenged in the final 23 laps, Hamilton achieved his fifth victory of the season, and the 27th of his career to equal three-time World Champion Jackie Stewart's race wins total. Bottas followed 30.135 seconds later in second and Ricciardo was another 16 seconds behind in third. Button could not get close enough to pass Ricciardo and finished fourth. Vettel, Alonso and Magnussen were in positions five to seven. Hülkenberg held off Kvyat in ninth to take eighth and Vergne was tenth. The final finishers were Pérez, Grosjean, Sutil, Bianchi, Kobayashi, Chilton and Maldonado.

Post-race 

At the podium interviews, conducted by former driver David Coulthard, Hamilton said that his weekend had demonstrated perseverance, "Yesterday wasn't a case of giving up, I didn't think I could do the lap, I was really shocked that the last sector was so fast. But coming here today I had my family with, just focused, the support from the fans, as I said, just spurred me on, and I really couldn't have done it without them." Bottas said he was enjoyed to pass other drivers and was complimentary of his team and car, "The plan was to come as high as possible, as high as the pace of the car is giving the possibility. I think as a team we made the most out of it." Ricciardo spoke of his feeling that had the race lasted one more lap, Button would have passed him. In the subsequent press conference, Hamilton said the fans' positive attitude helped him and that the win had no comparison to his one in 2008 as that race was held on a wet track. Bottas said Williams predicted Mercedes and Red Bull would be strong opponents and the team targeted points not the podium. Ricciardo stated Red Bull restarted on the hard tyres for track position and called his third-place result "one of my best podiums" of the season.

Räikkönen was declared fit for the following , and said he felt the crash was not his largest and hoped to avoid such incidents in the future. Mercedes non-executive chairman Niki Lauda claimed that the delay to repair the damaged wall was too long, unnecessary, and an over-regulation by Formula One. "This over-nursing of F1, being over cautious, over-controlling and over-regulating, drives me mad. This little guardrail issue is another example. There are too many people involved in making F1 as safe as the roads, which is wrong. They should have fixed it quickly, done something instantly, and then 10–15 minutes later the race would have gone on." Massa stated his belief that Räikkönen might not have crashed had he been more cautious in slowing and remerging onto the track. The FIA rejected suggestions Räikkönen should have been penalised because it decided he did not rejoin unsafely. Whiting responded to Lauda by noting safety was enhanced following Massa's 2009 Hungarian Grand Prix injury from being struck in the helmet by a spring.

Alonso told the press he expected to lose the battle with Vettel because his car's rear-wing aerodynamic deficiencies led it to not operate correctly, and Ferrari contemplated retiring him. "Vettel overtook me by going out of the track. He finished in front, but I was very proud of my 13 laps. If he had not passed me on the lap he did it would have been the next one because we were in slow motion and they were at real speed." Vettel described a series of radio transmissions where he complained of a series of suspected illegal manoeuvres such as driving off the track during his duel as "silly"; "I got the message that I should respect the limits and that he was complaining, so I was doing the same thing. I'm not sure who won the list-keeping. I think twice it was maybe a bit too harsh into Turn 6 [Brooklands], but it was good to get the move at the end." Nevertheless, former driver Allan McNish said on a BBC Sport online column the battle was "some of the best racing you will ever see" and it demonstrated "two world champions having to really work for their living." Gutierrez was found to be "predominantly at fault" for his collision at Club corner on lap line, and incurred a five-place grid penalty for the following German Grand Prix and three penalty points on his super licence.

The result reduced Rosberg's Drivers' Championship lead to four points over Hamilton. Ricciardo's third-place finish increased his points tally over fourth-place Alonso to eleven and Bottas' second-place finish advanced him past Vettel and from seventh to fifth. In the Constructors' Championship, Mercedes maintained its lead with 326 points; their advantage over Red Bull remained at 158 points. Ferrari stayed third while Williams overtook Force India for fourth with ten races left in the season.

Race classification
Drivers who scored championship points are denoted in bold.

Championship standings after the race

Drivers' Championship standings

Constructors' Championship standings

 Note: Only the top five positions are included for both sets of standings.

See also 
 2014 Silverstone GP2 Series round
 2014 Silverstone GP3 Series round

Footnotes

References

External links

British
Grand Prix
British Grand Prix
British Grand Prix